Bob Ostertag: All the Rage is an experimental album by the Kronos Quartet and Eric Gupton (reading). It is a composition by Bob Ostertag (with libretto by Sara Miles), whose loops and samples are alternated with music by the quartet. Ostertag composed the piece as a response to California governor Pete Wilson veto of pro-gay legislation in 1991. Proceeds went to AIDS research.

"All the Rage" includes sound that Ostertag recorded on location during the AB101 Veto Riot on Sept. 30, 1991, in San Francisco. The civil disturbance followed a protest against Wilson's veto of AB101, a bill that would have banned discrimination against lesbians and gay men in California.

A 2011 documentary short by filmmaker Steve Elkins recounts the history of the riot and of "All the Rage." In addition, Ostertag offered his memories of the riot and the background of the composition during a panel held at the GLBT History Museum in San Francisco marking the 20th anniversary of the riot.

Track listing

Critical reception
Rob Theakston, writing for allmusic, said the interplay between Kronos and Ostertag is full of tension of potent magnitude, and called it "an eloquent tone poem that fans of both artists will enjoy."

Personnel

Musicians
David Harrington – violin
John Sherba – violin
Hank Dutt – viola
Joan Jeanrenaud – cello
Eric Gupton – reading

Production
Recorded at Mastersound Studios, Astoria, Queens
Judith Sherman – Producer
Robert Hurwitz – Executive producer
Paul Zinman – Engineer
David Merrill – Assistant engineer
David Wojnarowicz – Cover
Frank Olinsky – Design

See also
List of 1993 albums

References 

1993 albums
Kronos Quartet albums
Nonesuch Records albums